Romy and Michele: In the Beginning is a 2005 television film and backdoor pilot starring Katherine Heigl as Romy and Alexandra Breckenridge as Michele, with a special appearance by Paula Abdul. It is a prequel to the 1997 film Romy and Michele's High School Reunion. Written and directed by Robin Schiff, its working title was Romy and Michele: Behind the Velvet Rope.

Plot

In this prequel to Romy and Michele's High School Reunion, it shows Romy and Michele as they graduate in 1987, and again three years later as they take on Los Angeles.

For years Romy and Michele have been dreaming to move to L.A. and become rich and famous, but they decided to put their move on hold while they save money. Three years have passed by and they've only managed to save $68, only $8 more than they had in high school. Despite their lack of money, they decide to go ahead with their plans to move to L.A. after seeing Pretty Woman. As the girls arrive in L.A., they decide to become prostitutes but chicken out after their first encounter with a client. As they walk home, a man lends them a dollar for a vending machine, and Romy and Michele are arrested for prostitution.

Cast
Katherine Heigl as Romy White
Alexandra Breckenridge as Michele Weinberger
Kelly Brook as Linda Fashionbella
Scott Vickaryous as Taylor Bradley
Nat Faxon as Chad
Dania Ramirez as Elena
Alexandra Billings as Donna
Rhea Seehorn as Ashley Schwartz
Paula Abdul as Herself
William Ragsdale as Kevin
Leigh Curran as Doctor
Leslie Intriago as Katie (Kevin's wife)
Amanda Righetti as Friendly Girl
D.J. Lockhart-Johnson as Rafael
Tim Maculan as Ned
Paul Tigue as John

References

External links

2000s English-language films
2000s buddy comedy films
ABC Family original films
American female buddy films
2005 television films
2005 films
Television prequel films
Films set in 1987
Films set in 1990
Films set in Los Angeles
2005 comedy films
2000s American films
American prequel films